Uranus is a tourist attraction in unincorporated rural Pulaski County, Missouri, United States, along the former U.S. Route 66 (US 66). All businesses are owned by Louie Keen, who calls himself the "Mayor of Uranus". Uranus states on the entrance sign, "It's Not a Town, It's a Destination."

Attractions 

The Largest Belt Buckle in Uranus holds the Guinness World Records title for largest belt buckle.

See also 
 Wall Drug

References

External links 

Landmarks in Missouri
Tourism in Missouri